The JWP Openweight Championship was a women's professional wrestling championship owned by the JWP Joshi Puroresu promotion. The championship, which was situated at the top of JWP's championship hierarchy, was introduced on December 2, 1992, when Dynamite Kansai defeated Cutie Suzuki in a tournament final to become the inaugural champion. At the time of JWP Joshi Puroresu's folding in April 2017, the JWP Openweight Championship was the oldest active title in all of joshi puroresu.

Like most professional wrestling championships, the title was won as a result of a scripted match. There were thirty reigns shared among nineteen different wrestlers. The title was retired on April 2, 2017, when JWP Joshi Puroresu went out of business. That same day, Hanako Nakamori won the final match contested for the title, making her third successful defense against Tsubasa Kuragaki.

Reigns 
Dynamite Kansai was the first champion in the title's history and Hanako Nakamori the final. Arisa Nakajima and Azumi Hyuga share the record for most reigns, with four each. Kayoko Haruyama's first reign holds the record for the longest reign, at 719 days, while Kyoko Kimura's only reign holds the record for the shortest reign at 25 days. Overall, there were thirty reigns shared among nineteen different wrestlers.

Title history

Combined reigns

References

External links 
 JWP's official website
 JWP Openweight Championship history at Wrestling-Titles.com

JWP Joshi Puroresu championships
Openweight wrestling championships
Women's professional wrestling championships